Naimer may refer to:
Kraus & Naimer, Austrian company producing switchgear, co-founded by Lorentz Naimer (1868–1944)
Karen Naimer, Canadian lawyer